Nateby is a village and a civil parish in the Wyre district, in the English county of Lancashire near the town of Garstang. Nateby has a primary school, a place of worship and a post office. It once had a railway station called Nateby railway station, but the station closed on 31 March 1930. In 2001 the parish had a population of 475, increasing to 584 at the 2011 census.

The manor belongs to the executors of the late R. Thompson, Esq. The admiral and MP Roger Strickland was the second son of Walter Strickland of Nateby Hall.

See also

Listed buildings in Nateby, Lancashire

References 

 http://www.genuki.org.uk/big/eng/LAN/Nateby/

External links

Villages in Lancashire
Civil parishes in Lancashire
Geography of the Borough of Wyre